Carl Wilhelm Nordgren (11 May 1804, Stockholm - 9 January 1857, Stockholm) was a Swedish portrait painter and professional trumpeter, for the Life Guards of Horse.

Biography
His father, Gustaf Daniel Nordgren, was a watchmaker. While still quite young, he took a job as a military trumpet player; largely because of his family's poverty, rather than musical aptitude.

He drew and painted as a hobby, and his skills were noticed by Count Magnus Brahe who, in 1828, helped him enroll at the Royal Swedish Academy of Fine Arts. There, he studied portrait painting with Fredric Westin. He participated in the Academy's exhibitions until 1856. On Royal commission, in 1831, he painted a view of Gripsholm Castle  

In 1827, he married Johanna Amalia Rautell. Their son, Axel also became a well known painter.  

According to his own accounting, he created over 600 original portraits and a large number of copies. He also did some landscapes, genre scenes and religious works, but they are much less familiar.

References

Further reading
Svenskt konstnärslexikon, Vol. IV, pg.237, Allhems Förlag, Malmö.
Biography from the Nordisk Familjebok @ Projekt Runeberg

External links

1804 births
1857 deaths
Swedish painters
Swedish portrait painters
Swedish landscape painters
Artists from Stockholm